Daniel Robert Gheesling (born September 1, 1983) is an American reality television personality, YouTube personality and Twitch streamer who is best known for his appearances on the American TV series Big Brother. He is often considered to be one of the greatest Big Brother contestants in the show's history.

Career
Gheesling was a Catholic high school teacher from Dearborn, Michigan. Gheesling taught health at Orchard Lake St. Mary's Preparatory School and was the assistant coach of the school's football team.

In 2008 Gheesling was a contestant on Big Brother 10. He went on to win $500,000 in the final with a 7-0 unanimous vote. He later competed on Big Brother 14, finishing as the runner-up behind Ian Terry, making him the first Big Brother contestant to appear in the Final 2 twice.

Since September 9, 2012, he has been making gaming content on Twitch and YouTube. On February 23, 2018, Gheesling became the first person to interview the renowned Ultima Online player known as StraightStupid.

Personal life
Gheesling graduated from Divine Child High School and Michigan State University with a bachelor's degree in business and a master's degree in kinesiology. On July 2, 2011, he married in Orchard Lake, Michigan. He and his wife have three children together.

References

External links

1983 births
Living people
Big Brother (American TV series) winners
People from Dearborn, Michigan
People from Orchard Lake, Michigan
Gaming YouTubers
American YouTubers
Twitch (service) streamers